The University of Maine at Presque Isle (UMaine Presque Isle or UMPI) is a public college in Presque Isle, Maine. It is part of the University of Maine System and one of two University of Maine System schools in Aroostook County (the other being the University of Maine at Fort Kent).

History 

The college began in 1903 as Aroostook State Normal School which offered a two-year teacher preparation program. It has undergone four name changes since then: The Aroostook State Teachers College in 1952; The Aroostook State College in 1965; The Aroostook State College of the University of Maine when it joined the new University of Maine System in 1968; and finally the University of Maine at Presque Isle in 1971.

UMPI's wind turbine began generating clean energy in late spring 2009 after the university reached an agreement with general contractor Lumus Construction Inc. on a $2 million project to install a 600-kilowatt wind turbine on the campus. This agreement established UMPI as the first college or university in the state and one of only a handful in New England to install a midsize wind turbine, according to officials. The wind turbine produces about 1 million kilowatt-hours of electricity per year and saves the institution more than $100,000 annually in electricity charges and saves an estimated 572 tons of carbon dioxide from being released into the atmosphere each year.

In January 2015, officials from the Foundation of the University of Maine at Presque Isle announced their completion of efforts to completely divest from all fossil fuels on campus. This effort began in fall 2013 and ended in November 2014. UMPI installed a 999 voltage solar panel array on the roof of its major classroom buildings Folsom and Pullen Halls as well as a biomass boiler and heat pump technology inside those buildings.

In October 2020, the college announced its first master's degree, a Master of Arts in Organizational Leadership.

Academics 
UMPI currently offers 1 master's degree program, 22 baccalaureate degree programs, 7 associate degrees, 40 minor programs, and 5 certificate programs.

The institution began using a proficiency-based model for certain programs in 2018. It also began allowing students who would otherwise fail a course to re-do material to ensure they pass.

The college received a $2.25 million grant to add programs in computer science and health administration in 2019.

Online learning 
Through the YourPace competency-based education program, UMPI offers self-paced online baccalaureate programs. In 2020 UMPI added its first masters program, a Masters in Organizational Leadership, through YourPace. Separately from YourPace, UMPI also offers three semester-based online bachelor's degrees.

UMPI's OpenU program allows learners of all ages to take specific online and on-site course for free if they are not currently enrolled in a degree program.

Northern Maine Museum of Science

The Northern Maine Museum of Science began in the early 1970s on the UMPI campus. Folsom Hall encompasses the Sun of this model and it ends with Pluto, just outside Houlton, Maine.

Student life

Athletics 
UMPI has 12 varsity sport programs and is a member of NCAA Division III and in the fall of 2018 joined the North Atlantic Conference. The college previously competed in the National Association of Intercollegiate Athletics (NAIA) and in the United States Collegiate Athletic Association as part of the Sunrise Athletic Conference Men's and women's sports include: Cross-Country Running, Soccer, Basketball and Nordic Skiing (governed by the USCSA). Male only sports include: Golf and Baseball. Women only sports: Softball and Volleyball. In addition, the university also hosts a variety of intramural sports and one club sport, ice hockey. The University Ice Hockey Club Team was the first team to play in the Alfond Arena against the University of Maine Black Bears losing 4–3 on February 4, 1977. The 1979 Wrestling team won the Northern New England Wrestling Championship, and the 1978 Women's Field Hockey team won the Maine State Championships.
The school's sports teams are called the Owls and team colors are blue and gold.
{|
!colspan=7| NAIA Honors Athletes and All-Americans  
|-
| 1994 ||   || Tamera Blades ||   || Scholar-Athlete ||   || Division II Women's Basketball	
|-
| 1996 || || Katherine Chabot || || All-American || || Women's Cross Country	
|-
| 1996 || || Neal Labrie || || Scholar-Athlete || || Men's Cross Country	
|-
| 1996 || || Pierre Michaud || || Statistical Leader || || Division II Men's Basketball
|-
| 1997 || || Jason Adickes || || Scholar-Athlete || || Men's Soccer	
|-
| 1998 || || Jason Adickes || || Scholar-Athlete || || Men's Soccer	
|-
| 1998 || || Shannon Henthorn || || Scholar-Athlete || || Women's Soccer
|}

Greek life 
UMPI is the location of chapters of Kappa Delta Phi National Fraternity, Kappa Delta Phi National Sorority, and Phi Eta Sigma National Academic Fraternity.

Notable faculty and alumni

Faculty 
Caroline D. Gentile – Associate Professor Emeritus of Physical Education; longest-serving faculty member of the University of Maine at Presque Isle.

Alumni 
Mabel Desmond – Class of 1964, served four terms in the Maine House of Representatives, from 1994 to 2002
James "Chico" Hernandez – Class of 1979, USA National Champion, FIAS World Cup Vice-Champion in Sambo wrestling, featured on a box of Wheaties
John Lisnik – Class of 1972, served in the Maine House of Representatives.
John Tuttle – served in the Maine House of Representatives.
Tyler Clark - Maine House of Representatives for the 6th District.

References

External links
 Official website

 
Educational institutions established in 1903
Presque Isle
University of Maine at Presque Isle
Universities and colleges in Aroostook County, Maine
USCAA member institutions
1903 establishments in Maine
Univesrsity of Maine Presque